In the south German language (of the Alemannic-speaking area, or in Switzerland), a gäu landscape (gäulandschaft) refers to an area of open, level countryside. These regions typically have fertile soils resulting from depositions of loess (an exception is the Arme Gäue ["Poor Gäus"] of the Baden-Württemberg Gäu).

The intensive use of the Gäu regions for crops has displaced the originally wooded countryside (→climax vegetation – in contrast with the steppe heath theory and disputed megaherbivore hypothesis). The North German equivalent of such landscapes is börde.

See also 
 Gau (territory) – also gives the etymology and language history of Gäu
 Gäu – regions with the name
 Natural regions referred to as Gäu plateaus:
 Neckar and Tauber Gäu Plateaus
 Gäu Plateaus in the Main Triangle
 Werra Gäu Plateaus
 Gäuboden
 Altsiedelland | Altsiedel landscape

Soil science
Toponymy
Ecosystems
Rural geography
Human habitats
Agriculture in Germany
Agriculture in Switzerland